The University of Arkansas Community College at Batesville (UACCB) is a public community college in Batesville, Arkansas.

History 
The University of Arkansas Community College at Batesville (UACCB) was originally opened in September of 1975 as Gateway Vocational Technical School, designed to provide vocational training to the area. In 1991, the facility was organized as Gateway Technical College, offering courses in electrician and mechanical fields. In 1997, Gateway merged with the University of Arkansas system, and a few months later renamed it as the University of Arkansas Community College at Batesville with the passage of a county sales tax in March 1998. UACCB offered both vocational courses as well as courses towards associate degrees and college courses toward "core" requirements at four-year schools.

In the years since its reorganization, UACCB has undergone several campus renovations. The first major renovation, completed in 1999, added an  Arts and Sciences building, as well as various landscaping and parking additions. The next phase of construction, completed in 2001, added a  auditorium and conference facility named Independence Hall (after Independence County, of which Batesville is the county seat). In 2002, the college acquired adjacent  of unimproved land and constructed a  Physical Plant.

Ground was broken in early 2010 for a new facility for Nursing and Allied Health. In 2020, construction was completed on the state-of-the-art Workforce Training Center at the far corner of campus. UACCB has a bright future and will strive to provide even greater educational opportunities for the citizens it serves.

References

External links
 Official website

Arkansas Community
Buildings and structures in Batesville, Arkansas
Education in Independence County, Arkansas
Community colleges in Arkansas
1991 establishments in Arkansas